Jack Cropley (27 September 1924 – 29 October 2009) was a Scottish professional footballer who played as a wing half.

Career
Born in Edinburgh, Cropley played for Tranent, Aldershot and Weymouth.

Personal life
He is the father of Alex Cropley.

References

1924 births
2009 deaths
Scottish footballers
Tranent Juniors F.C. players
Aldershot F.C. players
Weymouth F.C. players
English Football League players
Footballers from Edinburgh
Association football wing halves